The Chola dynasty was one of the longest-ruling dynasties in the history of southern India. In Bangalore the Cholas ruled nearly a century. The heartland of the Cholas was the fertile valley of the Kaveri River, but they ruled a significantly larger area at the height of their power, including the present-day Bangalore. During the reign of Rajaraja Chola I—around 1004 AD—the cholas captured Bangalore after defeating the Gangas. During their rule, they built many temples in and around Bangalore with the Chokkanathaswamy temple, Mukthi Natheshwara Temple, Choleswara temple and the Someshwara Temple being prominent ones. The Chokkanathaswamy temple at Domlur, whose earliest inscriptions date back to the 10th century AD, is the oldest temple in the city. Originally built by Raja Raja Chola I, the temple was later renovated by the Hoysalas and Vijayanagara rulers. The temple's deity was Lord Shiva, but later a Vishnu temple was built for the local residents who were mainly Vaishnavas.

The Chola Rule in Karnataka was curtailed with loss of Western Gangavadi in 1117 AD by the Hoysalas, but Eastern Gangavadi (part of Mysore district) was recovered by 1125 AD under Vikrama Chola and Chola territories in Kannada country existed till the rule of Emperor Kulothunga Chola III. However Tamil habitation in Karnataka, especially in Mysore district, precedes the Chola period and continued afterwards as well. Hoysala Kings built Someshwara temples throughout their kingdom. The typical Someshwara temple has a lotus pond or a taverekere included.

The Someshwara temple at Madiwala was built around 1247 AD. The Someshwara Temple at Halasuru, one of the oldest in the city. While the main deity is Nandi, other gods like Brahma and Vishnu are also worshiped here. It was later renovated by Kempegowda who built the Rajagopuram and constructed walls around the temple. The 800 year-old Kaalikaamba Kamatheshwara Temple at Basavangudi is the second largest temple in the city.

Apart from religious practices, the temples were utilized for scholarly activities thus providing employment for the people.

List of temples

References

Bibliography

Hindu temples in Bangalore
Tourist attractions in Bangalore
Chola architecture
Chola temples, Karnataka
Chola temples, Karnataka
Chola temples
Chola temples in Bangalore